Diego Javier Medina Vázquez (born 12 March 2001) is a Mexican professional footballer who plays as a winger for Liga MX club Santos Laguna.

International career
Medina was called up by Raúl Chabrand to participate with the under-21 team at the 2022 Maurice Revello Tournament, where Mexico finished the tournament in third place.

Career statistics

Club

References

External links
 
 
 

2001 births
Living people
Mexican footballers
Mexico youth international footballers
Association football forwards
Liga de Expansión MX players
Liga MX players
Santos Laguna footballers
Tampico Madero F.C. footballers
Footballers from Coahuila
Sportspeople from Torreón